More Joy, Less Shame is an EP by Ani DiFranco.

Track listing
 "Joyful Girl (Danger and Uncertainty Mix)" – 4:39
 "Joyful Girl (Peace and Love Mix)" – 4:39
 "Joyful Girl (Peace and Love Extended Mix)" – 6:26
 "Joyful Girl (Live with the Buffalo Philharmonic)" – 6:03
 "Shameless (Bathtub Mix)" – 4:52
 "Both Hands (Live in Austin, Texas)" – 3:05

Personnel
Ani DiFranco – guitar, vocals, producer, director

Production
Rob Howard – director
Doc Severinsen – conductor

References

1996 debut EPs
Ani DiFranco albums
Righteous Babe EPs